Salinispora arenicola is an obligate marine actinomycete bacterium species. It produces salinosporamide, a potential anti-cancer agent.

See also
 Salinispora tropica
 Salinispora pacifica

References

Further reading

External links
	LPSN
WORMS entry
Type strain of Salinispora arenicola at BacDive -  the Bacterial Diversity Metadatabase

Micromonosporaceae
Bacteria described in 2005
Marine microorganisms